"Gato de Noche" (English: "Night Cat") is a song by Puerto Rican rappers Ñengo Flow and Bad Bunny. It was originally released on December 22, 2022, by Rimas Entertainment.

Chart performance 
"Gato de Noche" peaked at number 60 on the US Billboard Hot 100 dated January 14, 2023. Additionally, it peaked at number 2 on the US Hot Latin Songs chart and number 28 on the Billboard Global 200.

Music video 
The music video for "Gato de Noche" was released on YouTube on December 22, 2022.

Charts

References 

2022 songs
2022 singles
Bad Bunny songs
Songs written by Bad Bunny